Meeden-Muntendam (abbreviation: Mmd) is a former railway station between Meeden and Muntendam in the Netherlands.

History
The former station lies on the Stadskanaal–Zuidbroek railway between Zuidbroek and Veendam.

The station was originally open between 1 August 1910 and 1 May 1941.

Bus service
Bus services 213 and 613 stop here.

References 

Defunct railway stations in Groningen (province)
Railway stations on the Stadskanaal–Zuidbroek railway
Transport in Midden-Groningen